Doryodes is a genus of moths in the family Erebidae.

Species
 Doryodes bistrialis (Geyer, 1832)
 Doryodes broui Lafontaine & Sullivan, 2015
 Doryodes desoto Lafontaine & Sullivan, 2015
 Doryodes fusselli Sullivan & Lafontaine, 2015
 Doryodes insularia Hampson, 1904
 Doryodes latistriga Sullivan & Lafontaine, 2015
 Doryodes okaloosa Sullivan & Lafontaine, 2015
 Doryodes reineckei Sullivan & Lafontaine, 2015
 Doryodes spadaria Guenée, 1857
 Doryodes tenuistriga Barnes & McDunnough, 1918

Former species
 Doryodes grandipennis Barnes & McDunnough, 1918

References

External links
 
 

 
Euclidiini
Moth genera
Taxa named by Achille Guenée